The Little Pigeon River is a  stream in Otsego and Cheboygan counties in the U.S. state of Michigan.

Tributaries 
From the mouth:
 (left) MacAndrews Lake
 (right) Burrows Creek
 Mud Lake

References

Rivers of Michigan
Rivers of Cheboygan County, Michigan
Tributaries of Lake Huron